Irby is a village on the Wirral Peninsula, in Merseyside, England. The village covers an area of 20 square kilometres. To the north of Irby lies the associated hamlet of Irby Hill. It is part of the Greasby, Frankby and Irby Ward of the Metropolitan Borough of Wirral and is within the parliamentary constituency of Wirral West.

According to the 2001 census, Irby had a population of 6,110, By the time of the 2011 census a separate statistic for Irby was no longer maintained. However, the total population of Greasby, Frankby and Irby Ward was 13,991.

History

The name Irby (Iri býr) is of Viking origin, meaning "farmstead or settlement of the Irish". It is derived from the Old Norse words Íri (Irishman) and bȳ (a farmstead or settlement). Historically, the name has been spelt as Irreby (1096) and Ireby (1232). 
Other nearby towns and villages with the Viking "by" suffix in their name include Frankby, Greasby and Pensby.

Although not mentioned in the Domesday Book, the land of the present day village was recorded as being granted to the Abbey of St Werburgh by Hugh Lupus in 1093.

Irby Mill
A reference to the existence of a mill at Irby was made in a rental agreement of 1431, whereby tenants were expected to "...grind at Irby Mill to the 16th measure." This referred to the miller receiving this amount in flour as a toll. This original wooden structure was replaced by a post mill in the early 18th century. After being disused since about 1878 and in a very dilapidated condition, the mill was demolished in 1898. Along with a similar structure in Burton, it was one of the last post mills of its kind on the Wirral. The demolition work was carried out by unskilled labour hired by the miller. They removed the brick base first, resulting in the whole structure becoming dangerously unsafe and crashing to the ground, narrowly avoiding injury or loss of life. 
The Irby Mill public house, which opened for business in 1980, stands adjacent to the site in a building formerly known as Irby Mill Cottage.

Irby Hall
Irby Hall was constructed in the early 17th century, with an entrance facade added in 1888. The hall was built on the site of an 11th-century moated manor and courthouse of St Werburgh's Abbey. The moat is now dry, but has a prominent outer bank. Irby Hall was made a Grade II listed building in 1962.

Geography, geology and environment
Irby sits on the eastern side of Thurstaston Hill, at the western side of a wide and shallow glacial U-shaped valley, formed during the Quaternary Ice Age. The underlying bedrock is Triassic bunter sandstone of the Helsby Sandstone Formation, and Triassic siltstone of the Tarporley Siltstone Formation. This is overlain with boulder clay from the Quaternary Ice Age, similar to the nearby Dee Cliffs, and clay soil. The bedrock is not usually visible, as it is at the summit of Thurstaston Hill.

Irby is bounded by Greasby Brook, to the west, which also travels through and alongside Thurstaston Common. The brook has its source in the fields to the south-west of Irby. Meanwhile, Irby is bounded to the north, east and south by part of the field drainage which forms Arrowe Brook.

Climate
Irby has a temperate maritime climate (Köppen: Cfb), similar to much of the rest of the United Kingdom. Being close to the sea and sheltered from the prevailing south-westerly wind by Snowdonia, the area has relatively warm summers. The winters are generally mild and wet, mornings with light frost are common, and there are few days of snow.

Demographics
The population was 96 in 1801, 180 in 1851 and 146 in 1901. Whilst not being diverse in terms of ethnicity, Irby is an economically diverse neighbourhood, possessing a mixture of large 1930s built private houses together with an estate of 1970s built homes in a range of sizes and an element of 1950s built council housing all in close proximity. In this respect it is regarded locally as a very desirable place to live. Irby is within the catchment area for two local grammar schools: Calday Grange Grammar School for Boys and West Kirby Grammar School for Girls. Despite the typically suburban character of most of its neighbourhoods, Irby is surrounded on all sides by a large amount of green belt and woodland.

Governance
Historically within the county of Cheshire, Irby was formerly a township in the Thurstaston and Woodchurch parishes of the Wirral Hundred. It existed as a civil parish between 1866 and 1974.  Irby was part of Wirral Rural Sanitary District from 1866, then Wirral Rural District from 1894 and Wirral Urban District from 1933. Further changes occurred on 1 April 1974, when local government reorganisation resulted in most of Wirral, including Irby, transfer from Cheshire to the newly formed metropolitan county of Merseyside.

It is represented on Wirral Borough Council by three councillors. The most recent local elections took place on 6 May 2021.

The village is part of the parliamentary constituency of Wirral West. The current member of parliament is Margaret Greenwood, a Labour MP who is the fourth representative for the constituency. The previous incumbent of the post, the third representative for the constituency, was Esther McVey, a Conservative politician who was MP from 2010 until 2015. The second representative, Stephen Hesford, was a Labour MP from 1997 until 2010. In 1983, the first representative of the newly formed constituency was David Hunt, a Conservative MP, who was elected at a by-election for the former Wirral constituency, from 1976. Earlier MPs have included Selwyn Lloyd, a former Foreign Secretary, Chancellor of the Exchequer and Speaker of the House of Commons, as well as William Lever, the founder of Lever Brothers.

Economy

Shops

Irby's small shopping area has a McColl's convenience store, which includes a branch of the Post Office. The shopping area also includes hairdressers, a florist, fast food outlets, restaurants and an off licence.

Services
Arrowe Park Hospital is about a mile from the centre of the village, and includes an Accident and Emergency department. Irby is served by a pharmacy and a dentist.

Irby has an MOT test centre on Mill Hill Road. The Irby telephone exchange serves 6,653 residential premises and 155 non-residential premises. The exchange is operated by BT and provides ADSL services, among others.

Community

Schools
Pensby High School is the nearest state secondary school. Irby Primary School is the local state primary school, with Dawpool CofE primary school also being nearby, towards Thurstaston. However children from the area attend many other schools on Wirral; Calday Grange Grammar School, West Kirby Grammar School, Birkenhead School, Birkenhead Preparatory School, Birkenhead High School to name five.

Churches

Irby has three churches. Two of these are the Irby Methodist Church and the Irby Evangelical Church. Meanwhile, St. Chad's Church is a branch of St Bartholomew's Church in Thurstaston. Frank Lester was a previous organist of the Methodist chapel.

Leisure
Irby has a village hall, situated on Thingwall Road, which hosted a performance by The Beatles on 7 September 1962. The village is home to the 1st Thurstaston scout group, which was started in 1933, shortly after the 3rd World Scout Jamboree, held about a mile away, in Arrowe Park, in 1929. The Irby Club was formed in the early 1930s, and is in the centre of the village, in a building which was once the farm house for the former Rookery Farm. Irby Library is on Thurstaston Road and was built in the late 1960s on the site of the 18th century Manor Farm. The library has its own group of local volunteers or 'friends'.

Public houses

The Anchor Inn is one of the oldest buildings in Irby, and, according to an entry in the BBC Domesday Project, was built as a cottage in the 17th century.  The Shippons is on Thingwall Road and is a sandstone village pub, converted from old farm buildings. The Irby Mill is away from the centre of the village, at Irby Hill, towards Greasby. This is a converted miller's cottage constructed in the early 19th century, which had its original windmill demolished in 1898.

Parks and commons

Sport
Irby has a cricket club situated on Mill Hill Road, which was established in 1948 and promoted to the Cheshire County League in 2001. The club operates four teams every Saturday. In the 2008 season, the 1st team, 2nd team and 3rd team were all promoted. For many years the 3rd and 4th XI's played their home games at the Seaview Lane cricket field until an adjacent field was obtained at the Mill Hill ground.

Irby's local football club has teams ranging from under 8's to men's. Inaugurated in 1992, the senior team won the local league in the 2008/09 season. The team motto reads Semper Paratus meaning 'Always Ready'. In earlier years Irby North End, playing at Seaview, enjoyed some success in the national John White League from 1972 to 1977. Occasional midfield loanee Andy McCluskey went on to found the group Orchestr al Manoeuvres in the Dark.players of irby north end David Dewhurst Andrew Potts  Dave roberts (founder) Craig Hartley, Dave Hardy Kevin "Sam" Hardy Simon Hooton Andrew Cowing Tommy johnson John Cuzza Currums PaulPhillips to name a few 

Irby also has its own Taekwon-Do School based at Irby Village Hall with separate adult and children's classes

Transport
The Merseytravel Saveaway ticket may be used on public transport in Merseyside. Prices are determined by Adult and Child status and the ticket is valid for one day. This ticket may also be used to cross the River Mersey on the Mersey Ferry, on direct services only. However these tickets may not be usd between 06.31 and 09.29 Monday-Friday.

The nearest railway station is Heswall (formerly Heswall Hills) on the Borderlands line. Trains depart from here for Wrexham and Bidston. From Irby, accessing the station is difficult via other public transport, and it is approximately a 45-minute walk away and offers only hourly services. Alternatively, buses may be used exclusively or to travel to West Kirby station, which is on the Wirral line of the high-frequency Merseyrail network.

Buses serving Irby, as of August 2020:

Notable people
 John Aldridge, former Liverpool and Tranmere Rovers footballer.
 John Bishop, Liverpudlian comedian, lived in Irby 1978–85.
 Lindsay Kemp, dancer, actor, teacher, mime artist and choreographer, born in Irby on 3 May 1938.
 Frank Lester, recipient of the Victoria Cross.
 Dinah May, English model and actress, born in Irby.
 Colin Whalley, field hockey international.
 Montague White, English cricketer, died in Irby.

See also
Listed buildings in Irby, Merseyside

References

Sources

Further reading

External links

English Heritage Archaeological Activities: Irby
BBC Domesday Project: Irby
Irby Thurstaston & Pensby Amenity Society

Towns and villages in the Metropolitan Borough of Wirral